This is the discography of rapper Lil Scrappy.

Albums

Studio albums

Collaborative albums

Mixtapes
 2005: Full Metal Jacket (Hosted by DJ Don Cannon)
 2006: Still G'd Up (Hosted by Big Mike)
 2006: Expect the Unexpected (Hosted by DJ Don Cannon)
 2006: G's Up (Hosted by DJ Drama)
 2006: Money In The Bank (G's Up Pt.2) (Hosted by DJ Smallz)
 2007: My Piggy Bank (Hosted by DJ Ulix)
 2007: G-Street: The Street Album (Hosted by DJ Don Cannon)
 2008: The Grustle (With G's Up) (Hosted by DJ Holiday)
 2009: The Shape Up! (Hosted by DJ Don Cannon and DJ Infamous)
 2010: On Point (Hosted by DJ Dirty Money)
 2010: Suicide (Hosted by DJ Scream)
 2010: Dat's Her? She's Bad (Hosted by Greg Street)
 2011: Tha Merlo Jonez EP (Hosted by DJ Smallz)
 2012: Full Metal Jacket 2 (Hosted by DJ Scream & DJ J1)
 2013: Grustling 101 (with Rolls Royce Rizzy)
 2015: Merlo's Way (Hosted by DJ Smallz)
 2017: Hopeless Romantic

Singles

As lead artist

As featured artist

Guest appearances

Music video cameos
 2003: "Never Scared" (Bone Crusher feat. T.I. and Killer Mike)
 2003: "Get Low" (Lil Jon & the East Side Boyz feat. Ying Yang Twins)
 2004: "Let Me In" (Young Buck feat. 50 Cent)
 2004: "1, 2 Step" (Ciara feat. Missy Elliott)
 2005: "Candy Shop" (50 Cent feat. Olivia)
 2005: "Twist It" (Olivia feat. Lloyd Banks)
 2005: "And Then What" (Young Jeezy feat. Mannie Fresh)
 2006: "Tell Me When To Go" (E-40 feat. Keak Da Sneak)
 2006: "I Luv It" (Young Jeezy)
 2006: "Rock Yo Hips" (Crime Mob)
 2007: "Get Buck" (Young Buck)
 2007: "Circles" (Crime Mob)
 2009: "Born An OG" (Ace Hood feat. Ludacris)

Notes

References

Discographies of American artists
Hip hop discographies